Rules of Dating (lit. “The Purpose of Love”) is a 2005 South Korean film starring Park Hae-il and Kang Hye-jung, and is the directorial debut of filmmaker Han Jae-rim.

Plot 
Lee Yu-rim is a high school English teacher. He's cute, clever... and shameless. Choi Hong is a student teacher, even though she is one year older than Yu-rim. She's cynical and always plays hard-to-get when a man shows interest in her. While going out for drinks one night, Yu-rim suddenly tells Hong that he wants to have sex with her. Hong is hardly impressed. And so begins a battle of will and wits, both between each other and within themselves, as both Yu-rim and Hong are unsure of what each other wants and what they want themselves. Dating and desire mix explosively. What is the point of this strange relationship? What is the object of their desire?

Awards and nominations
2005 Busan Film Critics Awards
 Best Film – Rules of Dating
 Best Leading Actress – Kang Hye-jung
 Best Screenplay – Go Yoon-hee 
 Best New Director – Han Jae-rim

2005 Blue Dragon Film Awards
 Best Screenplay – Go Yoon-hee and Han Jae-rim
 Nomination – Best Leading Actor – Park Hae-il
 Nomination – Best Leading Actress – Kang Hye-jung
 Nomination – Best New Director – Han Jae-rim

2005 Korean Film Awards
 Nomination – Best Film – Rules of Dating
 Nomination – Best Leading Actor – Park Hae-il
 Nomination – Best Leading Actress – Kang Hye-jung
 Nomination – Best Screenplay – Go Yoon-hee and Han Jae-rim
 Nomination – Best Music – Lee Byung-woo
 Nomination – Best New Director – Han Jae-rim

2006 Baeksang Arts Awards
 Best Screenplay – Go Yoon-hee
 Nomination – Best Leading Actor – Park Hae-il
 Nomination – Best Leading Actress – Kang Hye-jung

2006 Grand Bell Awards
 Best New Director – Han Jae-rim

References

External links 
 
 
 
 

2005 films
2005 romantic comedy films
2000s Korean-language films
South Korean romantic comedy films
Films directed by Han Jae-rim
CJ Entertainment films
2005 directorial debut films
2000s South Korean films